Turn of the Wheel is a 1996 album by Tempest. It was their first release on a major label, Magna Carta Records. It was also their first in a long string of albums produced by Robert Berry. Michael Mullen is pictured in the album artwork, but does not appear on the album (as he rejoined after it was finished).

Tracks
The Barrow Man (Sorbye)
Dunmore Lassies (Traditional)
The Soul Cages (Sorbye/Reynolds)
Bogey’s Bonnie Bell (Traditional/Tempest)
The Midnight Sun (Sorbye)
Winding Road (Sorbye)
Bonden og Kraka (The Farmer and the Crow) (Traditional/Sorbye)
For the Three of Us (Williamson)
Nine Points of Roguery (Traditional)
Cat in the Corner (Sorbye)

Credits
Lief Sorbye - mandolin, vocals
Rob Wullenjohn - guitar
Jay Nania - bass
Adolfo Lazo - drums
Keith Emerson, (keyboard on track 1)
 Robert Berry - additional keyboards
Jon Berger (acoustic and electric violins, pennywhistle on track 2),
Chojo Jacques (violin on tracks 5,6, 8)
Album produced by Tempest with Robert Berry.
Vocal Production by Mike Wible and Patricia Reynolds.
Engineered by Robert Berry and Mike Wible.
Recorded and mixed at SoundTek Studios: Campbell, CA.
Mastered by George Horn at Fantasy Records, Berkeley, CA.
Released by Magna Carta.

References

1996 albums
Tempest (band) albums